John D'Arcy may refer to:
John D'Arcy (cricketer) (born 1936), New Zealand cricketer
John D'Arcy (footballer) (1935–2019), Australian rules footballer
John Darcy, 1st Baron Darcy de Knayth (c. 1290–1347), English peer
John D'Arcy (1785–1839), Irish landowner
John Michael D'Arcy (1932–2013), American Roman Catholic bishop
John P. D'Arcy (1957–1994), American electrical engineer
John D'Arcy (British Army officer) (1894–1966), British general